The 2004–05 Divizia D was the 63rd season of the Liga IV, the fourth tier of the Romanian football league system. The champions of each county association promoted to Divizia C without promotion play-off.

County leagues

Arad County

Bihor County

Covasna County

Galați County

Harghita County 

Championship play-off 
The teams carried all records from the Regular season.

Hunedoara County

Mureș County

Neamț County

Suceava County

Timiș County

See also 
 2004–05 Divizia A
 2004–05 Divizia B

References

External links
 FRF

Liga IV seasons
4
Romania